George Herman Bennions, DFC (15 March 1913 – 30 January 2004), nicknamed "Ben", was one of the leading Battle of Britain Spitfire pilots.

Early life
George Bennions was born in Burslem, Stoke-on-Trent, Staffordshire. He joined the Royal Air Force in 1929 as an aircraft apprentice at RAF Halton and qualified three years later as an engine fitter. In 1935 Bennions married Avis Brown who died in 2000 and they had three daughters. Their son died in infancy.

Bennions trained as a pilot and in January 1936 joined No. 41 Squadron RAF in Aden as a sergeant pilot flying the Hawker Demon fighter. The squadron returned to England later that year to be re-equipped with the Hawker Fury, and again in 1940 with the Supermarine Spitfire. Bennions received his commission in April 1940.

Wartime career
While stationed at RAF Hornchurch, he recorded his first success on 28 July 1940 when he shot down a Messerschmitt Bf 109 of JG 51. On the following day, after shooting down his second Bf 109, his Spitfire was damaged and he had to crash land in Kent. On 15 August 1940 while on a temporary rest break at RAF Catterick, his squadron was in action against a Luftwaffe force of 120 bombers and 21 Messerschmitt Bf 110 fighters along the Yorkshire coast near Hartlepool.  Bennions destroyed one Messerschmitt Bf 110 of I./ZG 76 and damaged another. The squadron returned to Hornchurch and on 5 September Bennions shot down a Junkers Ju 88 and probably destroyed a Bf 109, and the following day two more Bf 109's. He claimed another Bf 109 on 9 September and further successes quickly followed bringing his tally to twelve destroyed (one German bomber, 11 fighters), five probably destroyed, and five damaged, including a Dornier Do 17. On 23 September 1940 he is credited by one source for shooting down Hans-Joachim Marseille over the English Channel. Marseille survived, and would go on to achieve 158 victories to rank as the most successful German ace against the Western Allies.

Bennions was severely wounded on 1 October 1940. That morning Bennions had been awarded the Distinguished Flying Cross and was about to go on leave; when he was scrambled (in Spitfire I X4559) to intercept Messerschmitts. He shot down one of the raiders before a shell exploded in his cockpit, blinding him in the left eye and severely damaging his right arm and leg. Badly burned and bleeding heavily he struggled to bail out, and somehow managed to open his parachute before losing consciousness.
 
He was found in a field near Hatfield, and taken to hospital where swift action saved his right eye, but nothing could be done for the left. Bennions was transferred to Queen Victoria Hospital, East Grinstead, where he was one of the first pilots in the care of Sir Archibald McIndoe, the pioneer of plastic surgery for the treatment for severe burns. As one of "Archie's Guinea Pigs", Bennions became a founder member of the Guinea Pig Club. Also, as one who had parachuted to save his life, he was eligible to join the Caterpillar Club.

Following remarkable recovery from these injuries, Bennions became a fighter controller and was promoted to squadron leader. In January 1943 he was mentioned in dispatches. He later served in North Africa as a senior controller and liaison officer with an American Fighter Group equipped with Spitfires. With only a limited flying category he was permitted to fly on convoy patrols; but was not allowed to take part in combat operations.

In October 1943, Bennions commanded a Ground control interception unit that was sent ashore at Ajaccio on Corsica. As he left the landing craft, an enemy glide bomb exploded, and he received shrapnel wounds. For the second time he became a patient of McIndoe at East Grinstead. For the rest of the war, Bennions was a senior fighter controller at various units in the North of England.

Post-war
Bennions left the RAF in 1946, and took a teacher training course, returning to teach woodwork, metalwork and practical drawing at Catterick where he lived for the rest of his life. Bennions was a skilled silversmith, and had his own hallmark. His hobbies included building and sailing a dinghy with friends and also flying until his seventies a de Havilland Tiger Moth aircraft in which he owned a share. For many years he was an honorary member of the RAF Catterick Officers' Mess, where his invariably pleasant and unassuming manner seldom gave the younger serving members any inkling of his previous life. He was a keen golfer, and was elected captain of his local club before being made an honorary life member.

References

Footnotes

Bibliography
 Bergström, Christer (2015). The Battle of Britain: An Epic Conflict Revisited. Casemate: Oxford. .

Further reading
 Thomas, Nick. (2012). Ben Bennions DFC: Battle of Britain Fighter. Pen and Sword. .

External links
 Imperial War Museum Interview
Obituary – Squadron Leader 'Ben' Bennions – Daily Telegraph
Squadron Leader George Bennions wartime photo – Science Museum
Squadron Leader George Bennions medals and flight jacket – Science Museum
Squadron Leader George Bennions oral recording reference his injuries and recovery – The Imperial War Museum 

1913 births
2004 deaths
People from Burslem
People from Walsall
Royal Air Force squadron leaders
Recipients of the Distinguished Flying Cross (United Kingdom)
Royal Air Force pilots of World War II
The Few
Trenchard Brats
Members of the Guinea Pig Club